In molecular biology, mir-145 microRNA is a short RNA molecule that in humans is encoded by the MIR145 gene. MicroRNAs function to regulate the expression levels of other genes by several mechanisms.

Targets
MicroRNAs are involved in down-regulation of a variety of target genes. Götte et al. have shown that experimental over-expression of mir-145 down-regulates the junctional cell adhesion molecule JAM-A as well as the actin bundling protein fascin in breast cancer and endometriosis cells, resulting in a reduction of cell motility. Larsson et al. showed that miR-145 targets the 3' UTR of the FLI1 gene, a finding that was later supported by Zhang et al.

Role in cancer
miR-145 is hypothesised to be a tumor suppressor. miR-145 has been shown to be down-regulated in breast cancer. miR-145 is also involved in colon cancer  and acute myeloid leukemia.

References

Further reading

External links 
 

MicroRNA
Tumor suppressor genes